Hyman Aaron "Hy" Lit (May 20, 1934 – November 17, 2007) was an American disc jockey based in the Philadelphia area from the 1950s until 2005.  In his 50-year career, Hy Lit broadcast from WIBG, WDAS/WDAS-FM, WKBS-TV, WIFI, WSNI/WPGR, KPOL, WKXW, among many others.  His last station was 98.1 WOGL, where he broadcast from 1989 until his resignation late in 2005. He was known as "the Jet Jockey on Flight 99" which was the frequency for WIBG.  The Broadcast Pioneers of Philadelphia  inducted Lit into their Hall of Fame in 2003.

1960s & 1970s
Lit dominated AM radio in Philadelphia from the late 1950s through the 1960s as one of WIBG's "Good Guys," as his Hall of Fame show drew a 71 market share, unheard of before or since.  He released several successful LP "Hall of Fame" collections of music he played on the show, the last of these when he joined WPGR in 1981. In 1977, when WIBG signed off the air, Hy Lit was the last DJ on the station. Around 1978, Lit moved to California after a brief stint announcing for the Harlem Globetrotters before once more returning to the Philadelphia area. 

In the late 1960s, Lit hosted the nationally syndicated Hy Lit Show from WKBS-TV in Philadelphia,  which aired in more than 30 markets nationwide.  Guests on the weekly hour-long show included such musical acts as The Fifth Dimension, The Monkees, The Four Tops and Marvin Gaye.

1980s
Since 1982, and many years to follow, Lit hosted a live oldies radio show at different area clubs (most notably the Woodbine Inn in Pennsauken, New Jersey), where he'd close his commercials by saying, "I wanna see your face in the place!"

Lit moved to CBS-owned WOGL 98.1 FM in 1989, hosting the highly rated "Top 20 Countdown" on Saturday and Sunday afternoons in addition to his weekday afternoon shift.

Personal life
Lit was born to Sam and Mona (Kessler) Lit, in South Philadelphia. He shares two children and three grandchildren with his first wife Miriam "Mim" Uniman whom he met while a rising star in Philadelphia. Uniman was a former Miss Universe contestant via being named Miss Philadelphia in 1956 (see reference two). He later married his third wife, Maggie (Russo) Lit.

Lawsuit
In the mid-1990s, it was revealed that Lit was suffering from the beginnings of Parkinson's disease.  Just after the death of Hy's wife, Maggie (Russo) Lit in 2000, WOGL and Infinity/CBS Broadcasting management significantly reduced Lit's radio hours, along with a significant decrease in salary. In 2002, a lawsuit was filed with the aid of law firm Spector, Gaddon and Rosen against the media conglomerate, CBS Broadcasting, which for a second and concurrent time decided to reduce Lit's radio time and salary and this time cancel his health insurance.

In December 2005, Lit, station WOGL, and CBS Broadcasting settled the three-year health and age-discrimination lawsuit, under the condition that Hy Lit would (reluctantly) retire from the station. Lit did his last Hy Lit Hall of Fame Show radio show on December 11, 2005. However, WOGL management would not permit Lit to reveal he would be leaving the airwaves.

Death
Lit died at 12:30 pm November 17, 2007, at Paoli Memorial Hospital of kidney failure. He is survived by his son Samuel Lit(died 2022), daughter Benna Lit-Martucci (born August 24, 1963, died April 19, 2019 ) and three grandchildren.  He is buried at West Laurel Hill Cemetery in Bala Cynwyd, Pennsylvania.

References
2. https://www.newspapers.com/newspage/74247717/

https://www.remembermyjourney.com/Memorial/19461229

External links
Hy Lit - Philadelphia / New Jersey Radio Legend

For more detailed information on Hy's career from 1954-1980 go to Hy Lit History
Broadcast Pioneers of Philadelphia

• https://www.newspapers.com/newspage/74247717/

1934 births
2007 deaths
American radio DJs
Deaths from kidney failure
Radio personalities from Philadelphia
Burials at West Laurel Hill Cemetery
Burials in Pennsylvania